A list of films produced by the Marathi language film industry, based in Maharashtra in the year 1933.

1933 Releases
A list of Marathi films released in 1933.

References

External links
Gomolo - 

Lists of 1933 films by country or language
1933
1933 in Indian cinema